Stefan Marinović (1561–63), also known as Stefan of Scutari was a 16th-century Serb printer from Scutari. He printed his books first in Venice and then in Scutari. Marinović always emphasized that he was "of the city of Scutari".

Venice 

Marinović printed his first book in printing house of Vićenco Vuković. It was the first part of Triod titled Posni Triod. Vuković rented his printing shop to other printers who were, like Marinović in his first book, obliged to print Vuković's name on the book's covers.

Typographers who worked at printing house of Vićenco Vuković included Hieromonk Pahomije, Hierodeacon Mojsije, priests Genadije and Teodosije and laity like Marinović and Jakov Krajkov.

Scutari 

Marinović built a printing house in Scutari in 1563. The second book he published was, according to its prologue, printed in Scutari. This book printed in Scutari was linked to the Venice issued by its style while its graphic was poor. It was printed on paper and had 224 pages.

Marinović brought a skillful printer Camillo Zanetti with him to Scutari where he completed Triod by printing its remaining part. Because Marinović used similar typography as Vićenco Vuković some authors believe that there is a possibility that he actually did not print his last book in Scutari, but in Venice. Other authors explain that he used typography similar to Vuković's simply because he liked it and ordered similar one to be made for his book printed in Scutari.

Marinović was chronologically the third publisher of Cyrillic books in Venice.

See also
Božidar Vuković
Božidar Goraždanin
Đurađ Crnojević
Hieromonk Makarije
Hieromonk Mardarije
Hegumen Mardarije
Vićenco Vuković
Hieromonk Pahomije
Trojan Gundulić
Andrija Paltašić
Jakov of Kamena Reka
Bartolomeo Ginammi who followed Zagurović's footsteps reprinting Serbian books.
Dimitrije Ljubavić
Stefan Paštrović
Inok Sava
Teodor Račanin

Bibliography 
 Posni Triod, 1561, Venice

References

Sources

Further reading

External links 
 "Triod posni" - Text written by Stefan Marinović in Triodion printed by him in 1561

16th-century printers
Republic of Venice printers
Venetian Slavs
16th-century Serbian people
Serbian printers
Serbs in Albania
People from Shkodër
Venetian period in the history of Montenegro